This is a list of deaths caused by car bombing as the primary method.

See also
List of mass car bombings

References

Car and truck bombings
Car bomb victims
Assassinations